Logan Elementary School is a public elementary school in Columbia, South Carolina. It was built in 1913.  The building was listed on the U.S. National Register of Historic Places in 1979.

References

School buildings on the National Register of Historic Places in South Carolina
National Register of Historic Places in Columbia, South Carolina
School buildings completed in 1913
Buildings and structures in Columbia, South Carolina
Schools in Columbia, South Carolina
Public elementary schools in South Carolina
1913 establishments in South Carolina